Hauser's Memory is a 1970 science fiction television movie directed by Boris Sagal and that starred David McCallum, Susan Strasberg, Lilli Palmer, Robert Webber and Leslie Nielsen. The screenplay by Adrian Spies was based on a 1968 novel of the same name by Curt Siodmak, which reworked the central idea of his novel Donovan's Brain (1943).

The dying scientist Hauser knows of missile secrets. In order to preserve this information, the Central Intelligence Agency has scientist Hillel Mondoro (McCallum) inject himself with the cerebrospinal fluid extracted from Hauser. However, Hauser's wife Anna (Palmer) turns out to be pro-Nazi, and the memory of this woman also becomes imprinted on Mondoro's mind. Hauser's memory starts to take control of Mondoro and causes him to try to even some old scores.

This film was a nominee for the 1971 Hugo Award for Best Dramatic Presentation.

Cast 
 David McCallum — Hillel Mondoro
 Susan Strasberg — Karen Mondoro
 Helmut Käutner — Dr. Kramer
 Lilli Palmer — Anna Hauser
 Leslie Nielsen — Joseph Slaughter
 Robert Webber — Dorsey
 Herbert Fleischmann — Werner Renner
 Peter Capell — Dr. Shepilov
 Barbara Lass — Angelika
 Peter Ehrlich — Kucera
 Günter Meisner — Korowiew
 Arthur Brauss — Bak
 Jochen Busse — Dieter's Impersonator

Filming locations 
 Palace Hotel, Copenhagen

References

External links 
Hauser's Memory at IMDB

Films directed by Boris Sagal
1970s science fiction films
1970 television films
1970 films
American science fiction television films
Cold War spy films
Films based on American novels